Kukna or Kokna may refer to:

 Canarese Konkani, a group of dialects of the Konkani language spoken in the Karnataka and Kerala regions
 A dialect of the Dhodia-Kukna language spoken by the Kokna people
 Kokna, speakers of the Dhodia-Kukna language
 Kukna Ajay Singh, Indian cricketer
 Kokna (river), tributary of the Drawa river in Poland